E-taxes can refer to:
The taxes imposed on goods and services traded online; see e-commerce
The taxes imposed on information technology products ("digital" goods and services)

See also
EGovernment
ECommerce